Cerbu River may refer to:

 Cerbu, a tributary of the Gilort in Gorj County
 Cerbu River (Râmnicul Sărat)

See also 
 Cerbu (disambiguation)
 Cerboaia River (disambiguation)